Powolny is a surname. Notable people include:

 Anton Powolny (1899–unknown), Austrian footballer
 Michael Powolny (1871–1954), Austrian artist
 Siegfried Powolny (1915–1944), Austrian handball player

See also
 
 Povolny

Czech-language surnames
Polish-language surnames